Vilve Jaaska (fl. 1990) is an Estonian botanist.

She has recombined the following taxon:
 Vigna sect. Catiang (DC.) V.Jaaska & Jaaska, 1988

See also 
List of botanists

References

Possibly living people
Year of birth missing
20th-century Estonian botanists